Yang Lei (Chinese: 杨磊; Pinyin: Yáng Lěi) (born 9 January 1993) is a Chinese footballer who currently plays for Sichuan Jiuniu in the China League One.

Club career
Yang started his football career in 2011 when he was loan to China League Two club Xi'an Laochenggen for one year. He made 12 appearances in the 2011 league season. He was promoted to Guizhou Renhe's first team squad by Gao Hongbo in 2012. On 4 July 2012, he made his debut for Guizhou Renhe in the third round of 2012 Chinese FA Cup which Guizhou beat Guangdong Sunray Cave 2–0 at home. He was loaned to Shaanxi Laochenggen again for one year in March 2013.

In March 2016, Yang was loaned to China League Two side Heilongjiang Lava Spring, He made a permanent transfer to Heilongjiang in March 2017.

Career statistics 
Statistics accurate as of match played 31 December 2020.

Honours

Club
Heilongjiang Lava Spring
China League Two: 2017

References

External links
 

Living people
1993 births
People from Lijiang
Chinese footballers
Footballers from Yunnan
Beijing Renhe F.C. players
Yunnan Flying Tigers F.C. players
Heilongjiang Ice City F.C. players
Chinese Super League players
China League One players
China League Two players
Association football midfielders